Muhammad Siddique ناز خیالوی (12 December 1947 – 12 December 2010), pen name Naz Khialvi, was a Pakistani lyricist and radio broadcaster, who is mainly known for his Sufi verse Tum Ek Gorakh Dhanda Ho (You are a Puzzle), later sung by Nusrat Fateh Ali Khan, a legendary Qawwali singer, making both of them a household name. He also hosted a radio programme, Sandhal Dharti at Faisalabad radio station for 27 years.

Biography
Muhammad Siddique, pen name Naz Khialvi, born in Jhok Khyal Chak No 394GB, near Tandlianwala, district of Faisalabad, 174 km from Lahore, in Province of Punjab, Pakistan. Khialvi later became a broadcaster with state-run radio, and also hosted a radio programme, Sandhal Dharti on Faisalabad radio station for 27 years.

He also wrote lyrics in Urdu and Punjabi.

Teacher
Naaz Khialvi lived many years with famous Urdu poet Ehsan Danish. According to him, Ehsan Danish is the real inspiration for him. He had learnt much from him.

Books
Khialvi's first Book "SaaiaN Way", comprising Punjabi "kaafi", was published by Misaal Publishers, Faisalabad in 2009; and his second book "Lahu kay Phool" which was later changed to "Tum Ik Gorakh Dhanda Ho", comprising Urdu ghazals, was still under compilation.

Award(s)
Naz Khialvi was awarded the "Excellence in Radio Compering Award" in 2000.

References

External links
 
 

Pakistani lyricists
1947 births
2010 deaths
People from Faisalabad
Pakistani radio personalities
Sufi poets
Punjabi-language poets
Urdu-language poets from Pakistan
Punjabi people